EW, Ew, or ew may refer to:

In arts and entertainment
 "Ew!", a 2014 song by Jimmy Fallon and will.i.am
 eBaum's World, an entertainment website
 Electric Wizard, a metal band from Dorset, England
 Eggplant Wizard, a character in the Kid Icarus video games
 Entertainment Weekly, an American magazine, published by Meredith
 Eugene Weekly, an alternative weekly newspaper published in Eugene, Oregon
 Extreme Warfare, a series of computer games
 Eddsworld, a British animated web series

In science and technology
 Electronic warfare, the use of electromagnetic energy in warfare 
 Electroweak interaction, in physics
 Electrowinning, an electro-chemical process 
 Entomological warfare, a type of biological warfare that uses insects to attack the enemy
 Equivalent weight, in chemistry
 Exawatt, an SI unit of power
 Extinct in the wild, a conservation status level

Transport 

 NZR EW Class Electric Locomotive, Electric locomotive used in the Wellington region of New Zealand

Other uses
 Eww (disambiguation)
 Ew (digraph), in the English language
 Each-way (bet), a wager consisting of a win bet and a place bet
 East West (disambiguation), comparable to "NS" for North-South or "UD" for Up-Down
 Emergency ward, a medical treatment facility specializing in emergency medicine
 Eurowings (IATA airline designator), a German airline
 Disgust